Orazio de Santis, also known as L'Aquilano (active 1568–1577), was an Italian engraver of the Renaissance period. He was probably born in L'Aquila. He made prints based on designs of Pompeo Aquilano. He also produced 74 plates of antique statues in Rome, the joint work of Santis and Cherubino Alberti, published in 1584.

References

Further reading
Vincenzo Bindi, Artisti abruzzesi, Napoli, Gennaro De Angelis, 1883

External links
Art Institute Chicago: Orazio de Santis
NGA Washington DC: Orazio de Santis
Metropolitan Museum of Art
Creatinilandriani.it: De Santis Orazio (detto L'Aquilano) – Sacra familia (accessed 2 April 2022)

People from the Province of L'Aquila
Italian engravers
Renaissance artists
Year of death unknown
Year of birth unknown
16th-century engravers
16th-century Italian artists